Dagobert Sekullic (9 March 1889 – 1965) was an Austrian equestrian. He competed in the individual dressage event at the 1924 Summer Olympics.

References

External links
 

1889 births
1965 deaths
Austrian male equestrians
Olympic equestrians of Austria
Equestrians at the 1924 Summer Olympics
Place of birth missing